Aulacostephanidae is an extinct ammonoid cephalopod family belonging to the superfamily Perisphinctoidea. These fast-moving nektonic carnivores lived during the Upper Jurassic period, from the Oxfordian to Tithonian ages.

Genera
Genera within this family include: 
Aulacostephanus
Pictonia
Rasenia
Ringsteadia

References

 JOHN K. WRIGHT   The Aulacostephanidae (Ammonoidea) of the Oxfordian/Kimmeridgian boundary beds (Upper Jurassic) of southern England
 Ammonites

Ammonitida families
Perisphinctoidea
Jurassic ammonites
Ammonites of Europe
Kimmeridgian first appearances
Late Jurassic extinctions